Zinkensdamm is a Stockholm metro station in Södermalm, Stockholm, Sweden. The station was opened on 5 April 1964 as part of the first stretch of the Red line, between T-Centralen and Fruängen. The surrounding area is known for the Zinkensdamms IP sports grounds, the Tantolunden Park, the Drakenberg area, and the STF Zinken hostel.

Gallery

See also 
 Zinkensdamm

References

External links
Images of Zinkensdamm

Red line (Stockholm metro) stations
Railway stations opened in 1964